Depresīvā pilsēta is the fifth album by Latvian band Dzeltenie Pastnieki, released through magnitizdat in 1986, and 'officially' as late as 2007.

Track listing
"Casio Song" (trad., arr. Casio VL-1, lyrics by Roberts Gobziņš) – 1:20
"Rudens pastaiga" (Ingus Baušķenieks) – 4:35
"Neaizmirstams brīdis" (Baušķenieks) – 4:45
"Xipermah" (Baušķenieks) – 3:20
"Brīnišķā zupa" (Baušķenieks/Andris Kalniņš/Mārtiņš Rutkis/Viesturs Slava/Zigmunds Streiķis) – 4:30
"Mākoņu sniegs" (Slava/Gobziņš) – 3:25
"Latīņu maiznieki" (Baušķenieks/Gobziņš/Rišķis/Slava/Streiķis) – 7:50
"Pedal Art #2" (Baušķenieks) – 3:05
"Nevaru saprast tā neko" (Baušķenieks/Streiķis) – 4:35
"Frustrācijas" (Baušķenieks) – 4:10
"Tu mana jau" (Baušķenieks) – 4:25

Credits
Photography - Ingus Baušķenieks and Lindes jaunkundze

Release history

References

1986 albums
Dzeltenie Pastnieki albums